Askil Holm (born 1 June 1980) is a Norwegian singer and musician from Namsos.

In 2006, he was a part of the big success when he played together with Espen Lind, Alejandro Fuentes and Kurt Nilsen. Their record Hallelujah Live sold 260,000 copies in Norway.

Holm has also seen success by performing at the famous "Jam Sessions" in Kristiansand, Norway.

Discography

Albums

Collective albums

Singles and EPs

Collective singles

References 

1980 births
Living people
Musicians from Namsos
21st-century Norwegian singers
21st-century Norwegian male singers